Navan railway station is a former train station which served the town of Navan in County Meath, Ireland.

History
The station was one of two serving the town, the other being , which served as the main station and was on two separate routes. Navan station was much smaller, with a single bi-directional platform serving the single track.

Navan station, along with the branch line, was closed in 1958 to passenger services. However, the station remains relatively intact, with several freight trains per day still serving the station to and from the Tara Mine.

Proposals
In 2007 the campaign group Rail Users Ireland called for the restoration of passenger services on the Oldcastle line - as a commuter service between Navan and Dublin. This was because the planned passenger Dublin-Navan railway line from Clonsilla, which is expected to use the Midland Great Western Railway alignment, will not reach Navan until undetermined future time. Rail Users Ireland's proposal was for Navan station to be reopened and two new stations (Navan East and Duleek) to be built, allowing a commuter service of 65 minutes into Dublin.

Rail replacement bus
A rail replacement bus was introduced in 1958 and this route continues to this day as Bus Éireann route 188 (Navan-Slane-Duleek-Drogheda with a latter extension to Trim). Until the 1980s/early 1990s the bus also served Drogheda railway station and until the 1990s or early 2000s the bus to Drogheda commenced and could be boarded at Navan railway station. Route 109 of Bus Éireann serves Cavan-Navan-Dublin.

References

Railway Station
Disused railway stations in County Meath
Great Northern Railway (Ireland)
Railway stations closed in 1958
Railway stations opened in 1850
Railway Station
Railway stations in the Republic of Ireland opened in 1850